Black Lotus may refer to:

 Black Lotus (Magic: The Gathering card)
 Black Lotus (company), in the information security industry
 Black Lotus Records, an independent record label based in Greece
 Bhakti Tirtha Swami or Black Lotus (1950–2005), spiritual leader
 Black Lotus, a demo album of the Sonic Syndicate
 Black Lotus (Sister Sin album)
 Black Lotus (Guntzepaula album), 2016
 Black Lotus, a member of the Femizons in the Marvel Universe
 Black Lotus Tong, a fictional criminal syndicate from the Sherlock episode "The Blind Banker"
 Black Lotus, a fictional character from the series Accel World
 Black Lotus, a character played by Angela Fong in the professional wrestling series Lucha Underground
 Blade Runner: Black Lotus, an animated television series
Black Lotus, a fictional organization from the AMC television series Into the Badlands